Pabuji is an Indian folk-deity.

Pabuji may also refer to:
 Pabuji Ki Phad, a religious scroll painting
 Kolu Pabuji, a village in Rajasthan, India